Phillip Poole (born 24 June 1981 in Windsor) is a multi-medal winning English ice dancer and ice dance coach.

Competitive career
Phillip Poole's skating career began in 1986 at the age of five and he competed at his first British Championships in 1991. In the 1990s he was the British champion in novice-level single skating. He was also the champion in intermediate-level solo ice dancing before commencing his couples ice dance career.

With his second partner, Charlotte Clements, Poole became the 2002 British bronze medalist on the senior level. The following year he teamed up with Phillipa Towler-Green and was coached by former World Champion, Diane Towler. Poole and Towler-Green were the 2005-2008 British silver medalists and the 2004 Nebelhorn Trophy bronze medalists.

Poole and Towler-Green represented Great Britain at the European Figure Skating Championships in 2006, 2007 and 2008. In March 2009, they competed at the World Figure Skating Championships in Los Angeles, representing Great Britain alongside Sinead Kerr and John Kerr.

Between 2001 and 2009, Poole was a member of the British Olympic squad.

Results 
(with Phillipa Towler-Green)

(with Charlotte Clements)

(as a single skater)

(as a solo ice dancer)

Coaching career
Phillip Poole has been an accredited National Ice Skating Association coach since 1999 and has taught at Slough and Alexandra Palace ice rinks. Since 2009 he has taught at the John Nike Leisuresport Complex in Bracknell, Berkshire, where he is a full-time coach.

Achievements of skaters coached by Poole in solo ice dance:

(in couples ice dance)

Other work

A young Poole is featured in 1998's The Young Ice Skater and Dorling-Kindersley's Superguides: Ice Skating (2000) books, where he is illustrated demonstrating moves and positions on the ice.

In 2006 Poole and Towler-Green starred at Somerset House's New Year's Eve extravaganza, televised live on BBC One, alongside stars including Jamelia, Natasha Kaplinsky and Sophie Ellis-Bextor.

During series two of ITV's Dancing on Ice reality TV show in 2007, Poole and Towler-Green were the ice dancing couple who appeared in the DFS promotional sting in each edition.

In October 2010 Poole starred in the charity gala event Inspiration on Ice where he performed ice dance routines with Dr Charlotte Hawkins, a Harley Street consultant in aid of Cancer Research UK, following an intensive 9-month training programme to take her from beginner level through to capable ice dancer. The event was hosted by Nicky Slater and Christopher Biggins, and also featured Poole's own ice dancers and other members of Bracknell Ice Skating Club.

Phillip played the role of Prince Charming in the 2010 Bracknell ice pantomime, Cinderella on Ice and between 2010 and 2011 he was the stand-in male pro skater for series 6 of Dancing on Ice with his celebrity partner, Faye Tozer, from Steps.

References

External links

 
 Phillipa Towler-Green & Phillip Poole - Official website

1981 births
English male ice dancers
Living people
Sportspeople from Windsor, Berkshire